Emerson Park is a St. Louis MetroLink station. This station is a major transfer for MetroBus and Madison County Transit and features 816 park and ride spaces and 25 long-term spaces. There is a pedestrian bridge that connects the station area to the other side of nearby Interstate 64 in addition to a small retail building in the passenger plaza with four storefronts.

In 2014, a transit-oriented development called Jazz at Walter Circle opened adjacent to this station. The 74-unit mixed-use apartment building offers more than 100,000 square feet of floor space and includes a full service grocery store.

In 2021, Citizens for Modern Transit, the St. Clair County Transit District, AARP in St. Louis, and Metro Transit unveiled the “Transit Stop Transformation” project at the Emerson Park Transit Center. The team overseeing this project converted the concrete area between the bus bays and MetroLink entrance into an interactive and engaging space that boasts a vibrant-colored jazz theme, spaces to gather, greenery, shaded seating, canopies, and a mural inspired by design concepts that were submitted by East St. Louis High School students.

In 2022, the St. Clair County Transit District awarded a $13.5 million dollar contract to construct a new public safety center at the Emerson Park Transit Center. The new center will house office space for St. Clair County MetroLink Sheriff’s Deputies, a Metro Transit Operational Control Center and the St. Clair County CENCOM West 9-1-1 Emergency Dispatch Center. It is expected to open in 2024.

Station layout

References

External links
 St. Louis Metro

St. Clair County Transit District
MetroLink stations in St. Clair County, Illinois
Railway stations in the United States opened in 2001
Red Line (St. Louis MetroLink)
Blue Line (St. Louis MetroLink)